ACPI Investments is an independently owned, asset management firm serving private clients, trustees, charities, family offices, and institutions. The company has offices in London, Jersey, and South Africa and manages over $3 billion in global assets.  ACPI offers services in portfolio management, private equity, corporate finance advise, and strategic wealth advisory.

History
ACPI was initially established as ACP Partners in 2001 by Joseph Sassoon and Alok Oberoi, both former partners of Goldman Sachs, in order to manage their own assets. At Goldman Sachs, Joseph was the Head of European Private Wealth Management, and Alok served as the Head of International Private Wealth Management. Whilst Joseph retired from ACPI, Alok remained as Chairman of the ACPI Group and is actively involved in the running of the business. Brett Lankester joined ACPI Partners from Goldman Sachs in 2007 and presently serves as CEO.

Today, ACPI is well-recognized in the wealth management industry and deals in all major asset classes including multi-manager, equities, fixed income, and alternative investments. ACPI focuses on capital preservation and active portfolio management on an absolute return basis.
UBP (Union Bancaire Privee) acquired ACPI in January 2019.

Services
ACPI attempts to preserve and grow its client's wealth by delivering attractive, inflation-adjusted returns over the long-term.

Employing a mix of a top-down and bottom-up approaches,  ACPI invests according to the relative return-risk profiles of various asset classes. The top-down macro analysis determines the overall asset allocation of each portfolio, whilst the bottom-up approach determines the composition of each asset.

ACPI's macro-strategy is to look for undervalued companies with strong balance sheets, defensible business models, high & sustainable free cash flows, and run by strong management teams in attractive markets.  The company's investment motto is "the better is the enemy of the good".

References

External links

Financial services companies established in 2001
Companies based in the City of Westminster